Aleš Jeseničnik (born 28 June 1984) is a Slovenian football defender who plays for Mons Claudius.

References

External links
PrvaLiga profile 

1984 births
Living people
People from Velenje
Slovenian footballers
Association football fullbacks
NK Rudar Velenje players
NK Domžale players
Slovenian PrvaLiga players